AD 42 (XLII) was a common year starting on Monday (link will display the full calendar) of the Julian calendar. At the time it was known as the Year of the Consulship of Caesar and Largus (or, less frequently, year 795 Ab urbe condita). The denomination AD 42 for this year has been used since the Early Middle Ages, when the Anno Domini calendar era became the prevalent method in Europe for naming years.

Events

By places

Roman Empire 
 Romans take control of Ceuta, a port city on the North African side of the Strait of Gibraltar.
 The territories of the current Algeria and Morocco become a Roman province.
 Dalmatian legate Lucius Arruntius Camillus Scribonianus revolts, but his troops defect, and his rebellion quickly withers.
 Claudius begins construction of Portus, a harbour bearing a lighthouse on the right bank of the Tiber.

Korea 
 Suro becomes the first king of Geumgwan Gaya, on the Korean Peninsula.

China 
 The Chinese General Ma Yuan represses the rebellions of the Trưng Sisters in Tonkin.

By topic

Religion 
 25 January – The Apostle Paul is converted to Christianity (the exact date is not provided in texts, but the Roman Catholic Church chooses to commemorate this date).
 Traditional date of foundation of the Coptic Orthodox Church of Alexandria by the apostle Mark the Evangelist.

Births 
 Herennius Philo, Greek grammarian and writer (d. 141)
 Sixtus I, pope of the Catholic Church (d. 124)

Deaths 
 Arria, Roman noblewoman (committed suicide)
 Aulus Caecina Paetus, Roman politician (committed suicide)
 Gaius Appius Junius Silanus, Roman consul (executed)
 Lucius Annius Vinicianus, Roman politician (committed suicide)
 Lucius Arruntius Camillus Scribonianus, Roman politician (committed suicide)

References 

0042

als:40er#42